The John Hancock Center is a 100-story, 1,128-foot supertall skyscraper located in Chicago, Illinois. Located in the Magnificent Mile district, the building was officially renamed 875 North Michigan Avenue in 2018.

The skyscraper was designed by Peruvian-American chief designer Bruce Graham and Bangladeshi-American structural engineer Fazlur Rahman Khan of Skidmore, Owings and Merrill (SOM). When the building topped out on May 6, 1968, it was the second-tallest building in the world after the Empire State Building, and the tallest in Chicago. It is currently the fifth-tallest building in Chicago and the thirteenth-tallest in the United States, behind the Aon Center in Chicago and ahead of the Comcast Technology Center in Philadelphia. The building is home to several offices and restaurants, as well as about 700 condominiums, and at the time of its completion contained the highest residence in the world. The building was named for John Hancock Mutual Life Insurance Company, a developer and original tenant of the building, which itself was named for the U.S. Founding Father John Hancock. In 2018, John Hancock Insurance, years after leaving the building requested that its name be removed and the owner is seeking another naming rights deal.

From the 95th-floor restaurant, diners can look out at Chicago and Lake Michigan. The 44th-floor sky lobby features the world's highest indoor swimming pool measured from heigh above ground level.

History

20th century 

The project, which would become the world's second tallest building at opening, was conceived and owned by Jerry Wolman in late 1964. The project was financed by John Hancock Mutual Life Insurance Company. Construction of the tower was interrupted in 1967 due to a flaw in an innovative engineering method used to pour concrete in stages, that was discovered when the building was 20 stories high. The engineers were getting the same soil settlements for the 20 stories that had been built as what they had expected for the entire 99 stories. This forced the owner to stop development until the engineering problem could be resolved, resulting in a credit crunch. The situation is similar to the one faced during the construction of 111 West Wacker, then known as the Waterview Tower. Wolman's bankruptcy resulted in John Hancock taking over the project, which retained the original design, architect, engineer, and main contractor.

The building's first resident was Ray Heckla, the original building engineer, responsible for the residential floors from 44 to 92. Heckla moved his family in April 1969, before the building was completed.

The 1988 film Poltergeist III was set at the John Hancock Center and was filmed in early 1987.

21st century 
On December 10, 2006, the non-residential portion of the building was sold by San Francisco-based Shorenstein Properties for $385 million and was purchased by a joint venture of Chicago-based Golub & Company and the Whitehall Street Real Estate Funds. Shorenstein Properties had bought the building in 1998 for $220 million.

Golub defaulted on its debt and the building was acquired in 2012 by Deutsche Bank, who subsequently carved up the building. The venture of Deutsche Bank and New York-based NorthStar Realty Finance paid an estimated $325 million for debt on 875 North Michigan Avenue in 2012 after Shorenstein Properties defaulted on $400 million in loans. The observation deck was sold to Paris-based Montparnasse 56 Group for between $35 million and $45 million in July 2012. That same month, Prudential Real Estate Investors acquired the retail and restaurant space for almost $142 million. In November 2012, Boston-based American Tower Corp affiliate paid $70 million for the antennas. In June 2013, a venture of Chicago-based real estate investment firm Hearn Co., New York-based investment firm Mount Kellett Capital Management L.P. and San Antonio-based developer Lynd Co. closed on the expected acquisition of 875 North Michigan Avenue's  of office space and 710-car parking deck. The Chicago firm did not disclose a price, but sources said it was about $145 million. This was the last step in that piecemeal sale process. In May 2016, Hearn Co. announced that they were seeking buyers for the naming rights with possible signage rights for the building.

Hustle up the Hancock is an annual stair climb race up the 94 floors from the Michigan Avenue level to the observation deck. It is held on the last Sunday of February. The climb benefits Respiratory Health Association. The record time as of 2007 is 9 minutes 30 seconds.

The building is home to the transmitter of Univision's WGBO-DT (channel 66), while all other full-power television stations in Chicago broadcast from Willis Tower. The City Colleges of Chicago's WYCC (channel 20) transmitted from the building until November 2017, when it departed the air as part of the 2016 FCC spectrum auction, and will eventually return as a part of WTTW's spectrum from Willis Tower.

On February 12, 2018, John Hancock Insurance requested that its name and logos throughout the building's interior be removed immediately; John Hancock had not had a naming-rights deal with the skyscraper's owners since 2013. The building's name was subsequently changed to its street address as 875 North Michigan Avenue.

Incidents 
On November 11, 1981, Veterans Day, high-rise firefighting and rescue advocate Dan Goodwin, for the purpose of calling attention to the inability to rescue people trapped in the upper floors of skyscrapers, successfully climbed the building's exterior wall. Wearing a wetsuit and using a climbing device that enabled him to ascend the I-beams on the building's side, Goodwin battled repeated attempts by the Chicago Fire Department to knock him off. Fire Commissioner William Blair ordered Chicago firemen to stop Goodwin by directing a fully engaged fire hose at him and by blasting fire axes through nearby glass from the inside. Fearing for Goodwin's life, Mayor Jane Byrne intervened and allowed him to continue to the top.

On December 18, 1997, comedian Chris Farley was found dead in his apartment on the 60th floor of the building.

On March 9, 2002, part of a scaffold fell 43 stories after being torn loose by wind gusts around  crushing several cars, killing three people in two of them. The remaining part of the stage swung back-and-forth in the gusts repeatedly slamming against the building, damaging cladding panels, breaking windows, and sending pieces onto the street below.

On November 21, 2015, a fire broke out in an apartment on the 50th floor of the building. The Chicago Fire Department was able to extinguish the fire after an hour and a half; five people suffered minor injuries.

On February 11, 2018, a fire in a car on the seventh floor required approximately 150 firefighters to extinguish.

On November 16, 2018, an express elevator cable broke. Initial reports stated that an elevator with six passengers plunged 84 stories from the 95th to 11th floor. Since express elevators are not accessible from floors within the express zone, a team of firefighters had to break through a brick wall from the parking garage to extricate the passengers, none of whom suffered injuries. Elevators to the 95th/96th floor were closed thereafter pending investigation. Subsequent investigation documented only a controlled descent from the 20th floor to the 11th floor.

A piece of cladding fell from the building on January 5, 2022.

Architecture

One of the most famous buildings of the structural expressionist style, the skyscraper's distinctive X-braced exterior shows that the structure's skin is part of its "tubular system". This is one of the engineering techniques which the designers used to achieve a record height; the tubular system is the structure that keeps the building upright during wind and earthquake loads. This X-bracing allows for both higher performance from tall structures and the ability to open up the inside floorplan. Such original features have allowed 875 North Michigan Avenue to become an architectural icon. It was pioneered by Bangladeshi-American structural civil engineer Fazlur Khan and chief architect Bruce Graham.

The interior was remodeled in 1995, adding to the lobby travertine, black granite, and textured limestone surfaces. The elliptical-shaped plaza outside the building serves as a public oasis with seasonal plantings and a 12-foot (3.7 m) waterfall. A band of white lights at the top of the building is visible all over Chicago at night, and changes colors for different events. For example, at Christmas time the colors are green and red. When a Chicago-area sports team goes far in the playoffs, the colors are changed to match that team's colors.

The building is a member of the World Federation of Great Towers. It has won various awards for its distinctive style, including the Distinguished Architects Twenty-five Year Award from the American Institute of Architects in May 1999. In celebration of the 2018 Illinois Bicentennial, the John Hancock Center was selected as one of the Illinois 200 Great Places by the American Institute of Architects Illinois component (AIA Illinois) and was recognized by USA Today Travel magazine, as one of AIA Illinois' selections for Illinois 25 Must See Places.

The building is only partially protected by a fire sprinkler system, as the residential floors do not have sprinklers.

Features

360 Chicago Observation Deck 

Located on the 94th floor, 360 Chicago Observation Deck is 875 North Michigan Avenue's horizon observatory. The entrance can be found on the concourse level of 875 North Michigan Avenue, accessible from the Michigan Avenue side of the building. The observatory, previously named John Hancock Observatory, has been independently owned and operated since 2014 by the Montparnasse 56 Group of Paris, France. The elevators are credited as the fastest in the Western Hemisphere, with a top speed of 1,800 ft/min (20.5 mph). The observatory boasts more floor space than its direct competitor, Skydeck at the Willis Tower. There is a full bar called BAR 94 which stocks local beer and spirits from Revolution Brewing and KOVAL Distillery. The observation deck also features an open-air "skydeck" area.

It has been said the elevators to the observation deck are the fastest in North America, reaching the 95th floor in 38 seconds if they could run the entire trip at top speed.

For several years in the 2010s, during its winter season, the observation deck would feature the "world's skating rink", with an artificial ice rink.

At one point, observation deck had a mascot named Seemore Miles.

In the summer of 2014, 360 Chicago added its TILT attraction. TILT, for an additional fee, is a series of floor-to-ceiling windows that slowly tilt outside the building to 30°.

Signature Room restaurant and Signature Lounge bar
Separate from its observatory, 875 North Michigan Avenue has a restaurant on its 95th floor named the Signature Room, with an accompanying bar on the 96th floor called the Signature Lounge.

Retail plaza
The building features a two-level outdoor plaza along its Michigan Avenue face. The plaza contains retail and dinning tenants. The top level of the plaza is at street level, while the lower level is sunken below the street level.

Current tenants include The Cheesecake Factory and The North Face Past tenants have included Best Buy

The plaza was originally rectangular in shape. Per the Chicago Tribune, the plaza was modeled after the plaza at New York City's Rockefeller Center. 

In 1988, plans were unveiled by the John Hancock Mutual Life Insurance Company (the owners of the building at the time) to replace the plaza with a "$20 million glass and marble three-story atrium". One rationale cited by building's management was they claimed that access to the building's ground level was complicated by the need of pedestrians to circumnavigate around the courtyard in order to reach the street-level entrance to the building's lobby. They also cited a belief that the building's entrance was too understated for a building of its level of prominence. This atrium proposal faced backlash from local residents who felt that such an addition would mar the appearance of the landmark building. In 1989, newly-elected mayor Richard M. Daley criticized the proposed atrium and the plans were ultimately abandoned.

In 1994, the plaza was renovated, with the sunken portion transforming from its previous rectangular shape to an elliptical shape. In 1999, Chicago Tribune architecture critic Blair Kamin wrote that this renovation had made the plaza a more "welcoming" space. This renovation came after the more dramatic late-1980s renovation plans were abandoned.  A further $10 million renovation for the plaza was considered by the building's owners in the mid-2010s which would have added features such as video screens and decorative prisms to the plaza.

Parking garage
Housed within several of the lower levels of the building is a parking garage, which cars enter and depart via a spiral vehicle ramp.

Antennas
Since its completion, the tower has been topped by two antenna structures. These antenna superstructures support a large number of broadcast antenna equipment.

For a long time, the antenna towers utilized incandescent red lights and a red and white paint scheme to provide a visibility to aviation in compliance with federal regulations. However, in order to forgo the expense and effort of annually reapplying stripped paint to the antenna towers, the tower instead installed red strobe lights atop the tower and eliminated the striped paint scheme, as striped paint is not required if structures are topped by such lights.

A sizable number of television and radio stations utilize the antenna towers. Many stations maintain broadcast equipment on both the John Hancock Center and the Willis Towers' antenna structures in order to have both a primary and backup broadcasting point.

In November 2012, Boston-based American Tower Corp affiliate paid $70 million to acquire ownership of the antennas.

44th floor sky lobby

The 44th level skylobby is the floor where the building transitions from offices to residential, with offices occupying floors below and residences occupying floors above.

Swimming pool
On its 44th floor, the John Hancock Center has a resident swimming pool. The pool area has double-height ceilings. 

The pool is the highest pool in the United States when measured by distance above ground level. The pool is also the highest indoor swimming pool in the world measured by distance above ground level. The planned 115th floor indoor swimming pool at Goldin Finance 117 is expected to surpass the John Hancock Center's height record for an indoor pool.

Resident/office tenant grocery store
On its 44th floor, the building has a  grocery store accessible only to apartment residents and office tenants. In 2007, operation of the grocery store was taken over by local Potash chain of grocery stores. As of February 2023, Potash continues to operate the grocery store.

Floor plan and tenants

 Mayle, Ray & Mayle
 Benihana
 Cimaglia Productions
 Consulate-General of Chile in Chicago, Suite 3352
 Consulate General of Denmark, Chicago, Suite 3950
 Big Shoulders Digital Video Production
 Exclusively Gourmet
 Etihad Airways (31st Floor)
 Golin, Suite 2600
 Hanig's Footwear
 360° Chicago
 Laurichem Inc., Suite 8609
 The Signature Room at the 95th
 IWG, Suite 3100
 Weber Shandwick, Suite 2400
 WDRV 97.1, Classic Rock Radio Station, Suite 1510
 FCB
 Starbucks, Suite 3

See also

 Architecture of Chicago
 List of buildings and structures
 List of buildings with 100 floors or more
 List of tallest buildings in the world
 List of tallest buildings in Chicago
 List of tallest buildings in the United States
 List of tallest buildings and structures in the world
 List of tallest freestanding structures in the world
 List of tallest freestanding steel structures

References

The Cloudbase Chronicles, Life at the Top -  An engineers Tale by Harry W. Budge III

External links

 
 360 Chicago, formerly Hancock Observatory
 875 North Michigan Avenue on CTBUH Skyscraper Center
 
 
John Hancock Center
Society of Architectural Historians SAH ARCHIPEDIA entry on John Hancock Center

Bangladeshi inventions
Colombian inventions
High-tech architecture
Peruvian inventions
Residential buildings completed in 1970
Residential condominiums in Chicago
Residential skyscrapers in Chicago
Skidmore, Owings & Merrill buildings
Skyscraper office buildings in Chicago
Streeterville, Chicago
1970 establishments in Illinois
Fazlur Khan buildings